Lux Video Theatre is an American television anthology series that was produced from 1950 until 1957. The series presented both comedy and drama in original teleplays, as well as abridged adaptations of films and plays.

Overview
The Lux Video Theatre was a spin-off from the successful Lux Radio Theater series broadcast on the NBC Blue Network (1934–1935) and CBS (1935–1955).

Lux Video Theatre began as a live 30-minute Monday evening CBS series on October 2, 1950, switching to Thursday nights during August, 1951. In September 1953, the show relocated from New York to Hollywood. On August 26, 1954, it debuted on NBC as an hour-long show on Thursday nights, telecast until September 12, 1957. With the introduction of the one-hour format and the move to Hollywood, abridged versions of popular films were often used as the basis for shows.

To introduce each act and interview the stars at the conclusion, NBC added a series of regular hosts: James Mason (1954–55), Otto Kruger (1955–56), Gordon MacRae (1956–57) and Ken Carpenter (1955–1957). Kruger recalled:
All I do is come up and tell the people who I am and what we're up to. I don't have a single thing to do with producing, directing or casting the show. Yet I get letters every week complimenting me on my production, my directing, my casting, even my script adaptations.

New episodes were broadcast during the summer as the Summer Video Theatre. In 1957–58, Lux shifted sponsorship to a half-hour musical variety show, The Lux Show Starring Rosemary Clooney.

For the 1958–59 season, the dramatic series was brought back with a new name, Lux Playhouse. The new series alternated weeks with Schlitz Playhouse. Those broadcasts began on October 3, 1958, and ended on September 18, 1959.

The series finished in the Nielsen ratings at #30 in the 1950–51 season and #25 in 1955–56.

Episodes

Notable guest stars

Among those cast in the productions were:

 Julie Adams
 Mary Astor
 Anne Bancroft
 William Bendix
 Joan Blondell
 Richard Boone
 Ernest Borgnine
 Eddie Bracken
 Scott Brady
 Walter Brennan
 Barbara Britton
 Charles Bronson
 Raymond Burr
 Hoagy Carmichael
 Art Carney
 Jack Carson
 Rosemary Clooney
 Lee J. Cobb
 Charles Coburn
 Nat 'King' Cole
 Jackie Cooper
 Broderick Crawford
 Bing Crosby
 Robert Cummings
 Arlene Dahl
 Laraine Day
 James Dean
 Melvyn Douglas
 Paul Douglas (actor)
 Joanne Dru
 Nelson Eddy
 Bill Erwin
 Barry Fitzgerald
 Nina Foch
 Janet Gaynor
 Coleen Gray
 Eileen Heckart
 Van Heflin
 Charlton Heston
 William Holden
 Celeste Holm
 Bob Hope
 Miriam Hopkins
 Dennis Hopper
 Rock Hudson
 Dean Jagger
 David Janssen
 Shirley Jones
 Boris Karloff
 Buster Keaton
 Grace Kelly
 Veronica Lake
 Burt Lancaster
 Angela Lansbury
 Cloris Leachman
 Jack Lemmon
 Gene Lockhart
 June Lockhart
 Jack Lord
 Peter Lorre
 Dayton Lummis
 Jeanette MacDonald
 Fred MacMurray
 Dorothy Malone
 Herbert Marshall
 Fredric March
 James Mason
 Raymond Massey
 Carole Mathews
 Walter Matthau
 Mercedes McCambridge
 Roddy McDowell
 Dorothy McGuire
 Butterfly McQueen
 Sal Mineo
 Vera Miles
 Thomas Mitchell (actor)
 Rita Moreno
 Dennis Morgan
 Audie Murphy
 Don Murray (actor)
 Kim Novak
 Margaret O'Brien
 Maureen O'Hara
 Maureen O'Sullivan
 Geraldine Page
 Lilli Palmer
 Dick Powell
 Robert Preston (actor)
 Vincent Price
 Luise Rainer
 Edward G. Robinson
 Basil Rathbone
 Ronald Reagan
 Thelma Ritter
 Lizabeth Scott
 Karen Sharpe
 Ann Sheridan
 Sylvia Sidney
 Alexis Smith
 Karen Steele
 Rod Steiger
 Jan Sterling
 Robert Sterling
 Rod Taylor
 Phyllis Thaxter
 Franchot Tone
 Claire Trevor
 Roland Young
 Beverly Washburn
 James Whitmore
 Esther Williams
 Natalie Wood
 Joanne Woodward
 Teresa Wright

References

External links
 
 
 Lux Video Theatre at CVTA

1950 American television series debuts
1957 American television series endings
1950s American anthology television series
American live television series
CBS original programming
NBC original programming
Television series based on radio series
Black-and-white American television shows
English-language television shows